The Arboretum Jean Aubouin (10 hectares) is an arboretum located in the Mothe-Clédou forest near Combiers, Charente, Poitou-Charentes, France. The arboretum was established in 1932 by botanist Jean Aubouin. It contains deciduous trees and conifers including Cedrus deodara, Sequoia sempervirens, etc.

See also 
 List of botanical gardens in France

References 
 Sylvie Boutet, Arboretum Jean Aubouin : forêt domaniale de La Mothe-Clédou, Charente, Fontainebleau : Office national des forêts, 1999. .
 Petit Futé description (French)
 France, le trésor des régions (French)

Jean Aubouin, Arboretum
Jean Aubouin, Arboretum